"Time of the Season" is a song by the British rock band the Zombies, featured on their 1968 album Odessey and Oracle. It was written by keyboard player Rod Argent and recorded at Abbey Road Studios in August 1967. Over a year after its original release, the track became a surprise hit in the United States, rising to number three on the Billboard Hot 100 and number one on the Cashbox chart. It has become one of the Zombies' most popular and recognizable songs, and an iconic hit of 1960s psychedelia.

Song information
Several other songs from Odessey and Oracle were released as singles prior to "Time of the Season". Columbia Records supported the album and its singles at the urging of new A&R representative Al Kooper. One of the singles issued on Columbia's Date label was the noncommercial-sounding "Butcher's Tale", which Columbia thought might catch on as an antiwar statement, at the time a popular trend. "Time of the Season" was released only at Kooper's urging, initially coupled with its original UK B-side, "I'll Call You Mine", without success. After previous singles flopped, Date re-released "Time of the Season" backed with another UK flop single, "Friends of Mine", and it made its breakthrough in early 1969, over a year after the band split up. It reached number three on the Billboard Hot 100 in March, topped the Cashbox chart, and reached number one in Canada. It did not chart in the band's native Britain, despite being re-released twice, but it later found fame there with Rod Argent saying that it became "a classic in the UK, but it's never been a hit." In mid-1969, it peaked at number two on the South African hit parade.

The song makes extensive use of call-and-response vocals (from singer Colin Blunstone) interwoven with fast-paced psychedelic keyboard improvisation by Rod Argent.

In 1998, Big Beat Records released a CD reissue of Odessey and Oracle containing both the original stereo and monoaural versions of "Time of the Season". It also featured a newly remixed alternate version containing instrumental backing underneath the vocals during the entire chorus. These instrumental backings had been mixed out on the original 1968 stereo and mono versions to create a cappella vocal sections. The outro is also different, with a different organ solo featuring only one organ, instead of the two interleaved organs in the original mix.

Milwaukee's Third Coast Daily.com called the song "something of a counterculture anthem".

In 2012, NME named the track the 35th-best song of the 1960s. In 2021, it was ranked at No. 349 on Rolling Stone's "Top 500 Greatest Songs of All Time".

Use in pop culture 
"Time of the Season" is frequently used in pop culture to represent the era of its release. It is featured in numerous films, including 1969, Awakenings, A Walk on the Moon, and Riding the Bullet, all of which depict 1969, The Conjuring, which depicts 1971, Cruella, which depicts 1970s Britain, and in All the Money in the World, which depicts 1973. The Zombies and "Time of the Season", as well as "She's Not There", are intensively used in Thomas Vinterberg's Dear Wendy (2006).  The song was also featured in the South Park season 2 episode "The Mexican Staring Frog of Southern Sri Lanka" during a flashback to the Vietnam War and again during another Vietnam flashback in season 14 episode, "201".

Charts

Weekly charts

Year-end charts

Certifications

Cover versions and samples
The song has been covered many times by other bands in recordings, including:
 In 1969, Thyme covered "Time of the Season" for A-Square records. 
 In 1981, Pino D'Angio included an Italian version of "Time of the Season" with different lyrics titled "Signorina" on his album ...Balla!
 Michael Damian covered the song as the title track of his 1994 LP.
 In 1997, Kurt Elling recorded a jazz version on the album The Messenger.
 In 2003, Ben Taylor recorded the song for his album Famous Among the Barns, later featured in the horror film Prom Night (2008). 
 In 2005, The Guess Who released a cover of the song in the compilation album Let's Go. 
 Dave Matthews Band had the song on the CD-DVD Weekend on the Rocks (2005) and Live Trax Vol. 9 (2007).
 Also in 2007, it was recorded by Tommy Shaw (of Styx) and Jack Blades (of Night Ranger) for their album Influence.
 America remade "Time of the Season" for their 2012 release Back Pages, a cover album.
 In 2018, Hawaiian ukulele artist Jake Shimabukuro covered the song on his album, The Greatest Day.

It has been sampled many times, including in 2005 on the Necro album The Sexorcist in the opening track "Who's Ya Daddy?"; in 2009 by Melanie Fiona in her single "Give It to Me Right"; in 2011 on the ScHoolboy Q album Setbacks in the bonus track "Rolling Stone", which features the rap supergroup Black Hippy; in the outro on Miguel's "Don't Look Back" from the 2012 album Kaleidoscope Dream; Eminem's 2013 album The Marshall Mathers LP 2, in "Rhyme or Reason"; and on Insane Clown Posse’s 2019 album Fearless Fred Fury, in “Low”.

References

External links
 

1967 songs
1968 singles
The Zombies songs
Cashbox number-one singles
RPM Top Singles number-one singles
Blake Lewis songs
Songs written by Rod Argent
Columbia Records singles
CBS Records singles